Bukovje (meaning "Beech trees") is a Slavic place name that may refer to:

Bukovje, Brežice, a village in the Municipality of Brežice, southeastern Slovenia
Bukovje, Dravograd, a village in the Municipality of Dravograd, northeastern Slovenia
Bukovje, Postojna, a village in the Municipality of Postojna, southwestern Slovenia
Bukovje pri Slivnici, a village in the Municipality of Šentjur, eastern Slovenia
Bukovje v Babni Gori, a village in the Municipality of Šmarje pri Jelšah, eastern Slovenia